Mohammad Baba as-Samasi (Urdu محمد بابا السماسی ) was a Sufi  of the  Naqshbandi order. He was born in Sammas, a village on the outskirts of Ramitan,  from Bukhara, Uzbekistan. He made progress in his journey by understanding the knowledge of the Qur'an, memorizing the Qur'an and the Hadith of the Messenger of Allah, and become an expert in Jurisprudence. Then he began to study Speculative Theology, Logic, Philosophy (‘ilm al-Kalam) and History, until he was named  walking encyclopedia of all fields of science and art. He followed Shaykh Ali Ramitani and continued to fight against himself. He practiced daily retreat to the point of purity of maqam until his Shaykh was allowed to transfer the Divine Knowledge of the supernatural into his heart. He became very famous for his miraculous powers and the height of his maqam's virtues. Shaykh 'Ali Ramitani chose him as his successor before his death and ordered all his disciples to follow him and afterward chain transferred from Mohammad Baba As-Samasi to  Amir Kulal.

References

Naqshbandi order
Sufi religious leaders
Sufis
Founders of Sufi orders
Sufi saints
1195 births
1257 deaths